In set theory and related branches of mathematics, the von Neumann universe, or von Neumann hierarchy of sets, denoted by V, is the class of hereditary well-founded sets. This collection, which is formalized by Zermelo–Fraenkel set theory (ZFC), is often used to provide an interpretation or motivation of the axioms of ZFC. The concept is named after John von Neumann, although it was first published by Ernst Zermelo in 1930.

The rank of a well-founded set is defined inductively as the smallest ordinal number greater than the ranks of all members of the set. In particular, the rank of the empty set is zero, and every ordinal has a rank equal to itself. The sets in V are divided into the transfinite hierarchy Vα, called the cumulative hierarchy, based on their rank.

Definition 

The cumulative hierarchy is a collection of sets Vα
indexed by the class of ordinal numbers; in particular, Vα is the set of all sets having ranks less than α. Thus there is one set Vα for each ordinal number α. Vα may be defined by transfinite recursion as follows:
 Let V0 be the empty set:

 For any ordinal number β, let Vβ+1 be the power set of Vβ:
 
 For any limit ordinal λ, let Vλ be the union of all the V-stages so far:
 
A crucial fact about this definition is that there is a single formula φ(α,x) in the language of ZFC that states "the set x is in Vα".

The sets  Vα are called stages or ranks.

The class V is defined to be the union of all the V-stages:
 

An equivalent definition sets

The rank of a set S is the smallest α such that  Another way to calculate rank is:
.

Finite and low cardinality stages of the hierarchy

The first five von Neumann stages V0 to V4 may be visualized as follows. (An empty box represents the empty set. A box containing only an empty box represents the set containing only the empty set, and so forth.)

This sequence exhibits tetrational growth. The set V5 contains 216 = 65536 elements; the set V6 contains 265536 elements, which very substantially exceeds the number of atoms in the known universe; and for any natural n, the set Vn+1 contains 2 ↑↑ n elements using Knuth's up-arrow notation. So the finite stages of the cumulative hierarchy cannot be written down explicitly after stage 5. The set Vω has the same cardinality as ω. The set Vω+1 has the same cardinality as the set of real numbers.

Applications and interpretations

Applications of V as models for set theories
If ω is the set of natural numbers, then Vω is the set of hereditarily finite sets, which is a model of set theory without the axiom of infinity.

Vω+ω is the universe of "ordinary mathematics", and is a model of Zermelo set theory.  A simple argument in favour of the adequacy of Vω+ω is the observation that Vω+1 is adequate for the integers, while Vω+2 is adequate for the real numbers, and most other normal mathematics can be built as relations of various kinds from these sets without needing the axiom of replacement to go outside Vω+ω.

If κ is an inaccessible cardinal, then Vκ is a model of Zermelo–Fraenkel set theory (ZFC) itself, and Vκ+1 is a model of Morse–Kelley set theory. (Note that every ZFC model is also a ZF model, and every ZF model is also a Z model.)

Interpretation of V as the "set of all sets"
V is not "the set of all sets" for two reasons. First, it is not a set; although each individual stage Vα is a set, their union V is a proper class. Second, the sets in V are only the well-founded sets. The axiom of foundation (or regularity) demands that every set be well founded and hence in V, and thus in ZFC every set is in V. But other axiom systems may omit the axiom of foundation or replace it by a strong negation (an example is Aczel's anti-foundation axiom). These non-well-founded set theories are not commonly employed, but are still possible to study.

A third objection to the "set of all sets" interpretation is that not all sets are necessarily "pure sets", which are constructed from the empty set using power sets and unions. Zermelo proposed in 1908 the inclusion of urelements, from which he constructed a transfinite recursive hierarchy in 1930. Such urelements are used extensively in model theory, particularly in Fraenkel-Mostowski models.

V and the axiom of regularity
The formula V = ⋃αVα is often considered to be a theorem, not a definition. Roitman states (without references) that the realization that the axiom of regularity is equivalent to the equality of the universe of ZF sets to the cumulative hierarchy is due to von Neumann.

The existential status of V

Since the class V may be considered to be the arena for most of mathematics, it is important to establish that it "exists" in some sense. Since existence is a difficult concept, one typically replaces the existence question with the consistency question, that is, whether the concept is free of contradictions. A major obstacle is posed by Gödel's incompleteness theorems, which effectively imply the impossibility of proving the consistency of ZF set theory in ZF set theory itself, provided that it is in fact consistent.

The integrity of the von Neumann universe depends fundamentally on the integrity of the ordinal numbers, which act as the rank parameter in the construction, and the integrity of transfinite induction, by which both the ordinal numbers and the von Neumann universe are constructed. The integrity of the ordinal number construction may be said to rest upon von Neumann's 1923 and 1928 papers. The integrity of the construction of V by transfinite induction may be said to have then been established in Zermelo's 1930 paper.

History

The cumulative type hierarchy, also known as the von Neumann universe, is claimed by Gregory H. Moore (1982) to be inaccurately attributed to von Neumann. The first publication of the von Neumann universe was by Ernst Zermelo in 1930.

Existence and uniqueness of the general transfinite recursive definition of sets was demonstrated in 1928 by von Neumann for both Zermelo-Fraenkel set theory and Neumann's own set theory (which later developed into NBG set theory). In neither of these papers did he apply his transfinite recursive method to construct the universe of all sets. The presentations of the von Neumann universe by Bernays and Mendelson both give credit to von Neumann for the transfinite induction construction method, although not for its application to the construction of the universe of ordinary sets.

The notation V is not a tribute to the name of von Neumann. It was used for the universe of sets in 1889 by Peano, the letter V signifying "Verum", which he used both as a logical symbol and to denote the class of all individuals. Peano's notation V was adopted also by Whitehead and Russell for the class of all sets in 1910. The V notation (for the class of all sets) was not used by von Neumann in his 1920s papers about ordinal numbers and transfinite induction. Paul Cohen explicitly attributes his use of the letter V (for the class of all sets) to a 1940 paper by Gödel, although Gödel most likely obtained the notation from earlier sources such as Whitehead and Russell.

Philosophical perspectives

There are two approaches to understanding the relationship of the von Neumann universe V to ZFC (along with many variations of each approach, and shadings between them). Roughly, formalists will tend to view V as something that flows from the ZFC axioms (for example, ZFC proves that every set is in V). On the other hand, realists are more likely to see the von Neumann hierarchy as something directly accessible to the intuition, and the axioms of ZFC as propositions for whose truth in V we can give direct intuitive arguments in natural language. A possible middle position is that the mental picture of the von Neumann hierarchy provides the ZFC axioms with a motivation (so that they are not arbitrary), but does not necessarily describe objects with real existence.

See also

Universe (mathematics)
Constructible universe
Grothendieck universe
Inaccessible cardinal
S (set theory)

Notes

References 
 
 
 
 
 
 
 
 
 
 
 
 
 
 
 
 . English translation: 
 
 
 
 

John von Neumann
Set-theoretic universes